is a Japanese track and field sprinter. She competed in the 4 × 100 meters relay at the 2009 World Championships and did not qualify for the final.

She married her coach Akinori Minato in August 2020.

Personal bests

International competitions

National title
National Corporate Championships
200 m: 2018

Circuit win
National Grand Prix Series (200 m)
Overall winner: 2019

References

External links

Maki Wada at JAAF 
Maki Wada at Mizuno Track Club 
Maki Wada at TBS  (archived)

1986 births
Living people
Japanese female sprinters
Sportspeople from Kyoto Prefecture
Ryukoku University alumni
World Athletics Championships athletes for Japan